The Church of St Andrew is a Church of England parish church in the centre of Rugby, in Warwickshire, England. It is a grade II* listed building. It is unique in having two peals of bells hung in separate towers and is part of the Major Churches Network.

History
The first record of a church at the site was from 1140, originally as a chapel of the mother church at nearby Clifton-upon-Dunsmore, until Rugby became a parish in 1221. Nothing remains of the original church, as it was rebuilt in either the 13th or 14th century. According to a local legend, the tower was built from stones from a castle at Rugby, which had been demolished on the orders of Henry II, who forbade private fortifications without royal approval, however there was no prohibition against fortified churches, and so the tower may have been constructed, nominally as an addition to the church, but in reality as a way to provide a place of defence, while still conforming to the statute. The west tower is usually dated to the 14th century, but was possibly built during the reign of Henry III (1216–1272), and is Rugby's oldest building. The church has other artefacts of medieval Rugby including the 13th-century parish chest, and a medieval font.

In order to cater for the growing population of the town, the church was extensively rebuilt on a much larger footprint in the 19th century, to the designs of William Butterfield, retaining only the tower and nave arcade from the medieval church. These works were carried out between 1877 and 1879.

Very unusually, both of the church towers have ringable bells, the main peal of bells (all cast in 1896 by Mears & Stainbank, London) being located in the eastern tower, and the old peal (all cast in 1711 by Joseph Smith of Edgbaston) located in the western tower.

On 11 October 1949, the church was designated a grade II* listed building.

Architecture
The church is built from Bath stone with some detailing in red Alton stone, and is set under a grey slate roof.  It contains a splendid stained glass East window by Clayton and Bell and also an equally impressive West window by the same company.  Near the organ is a mosaic by the famous Italian company of Antonio Salviati of Murano, Venice. The building has been described as representing "a competent Victorian design with distinctive elements and style strongly influenced by early medieval English architecture." Some consider the interior to be the pinnacle of Butterfield's most highly refined work.  The design of the church's east tower and spire bears resemblance to Butterfield's other works, such as Adelaide Cathedral.

Present day
St Andrew's stands in the liberal catholic tradition of the Church of England.

Notable clergy

 Robin Gill, theologian, served his curacy here from 1968 to 1971
 Geoffrey Studdert Kennedy, known as "Woodbine Willie", served his curacy here before the First World War.

Gallery

References

External links
 Church website
 A Church Near You entry

Grade II* listed churches in Warwickshire
14th-century church buildings in England
William Butterfield buildings
Buildings and structures in Rugby, Warwickshire
Church of England church buildings in Warwickshire
Anglo-Catholic church buildings in Warwickshire
Fortified church buildings in England